William Thomas Grant (1876–1972) was the founder of a chain of U.S. mass-merchandise stores bearing his name, W. T. Grant, and an important American philanthropist.

Biography
Grant was born in Stevensville, Bradford County, Pennsylvania; his family moved to Massachusetts when he was approximately 5 years of age.  

At age 7 Grant began his sales career by selling flower seeds. Years later, he wanted to sell people what they needed at prices they could afford, with only a modest profit. In 1906, at 30 years of age he opened his first "W. T. Grant Co. 25 Cent Store" in Lynn, Massachusetts.

His initial capital was $1,000 he had saved from his work as a salesman. This modest profit, coupled with a fast turnover of inventory, caused Grant's business to grow to almost $100 million in annual sales by 1936, the same year that he started the William T. Grant Foundation. The stores were generally of the dime store format located in downtowns.

Among his avocations were philosophy, painting, and local philanthropy. In his later years, Grant was chairman of the board of the W. T. Grant Company and president of the Grant Foundation, and later chairman of the board. He received honorary Doctor of Laws degrees from Bates College in Maine and the University of Miami. 

He retired from both the W. T. Grant Company and the Grant Foundation at age 90, yet still served in an honorary capacity until his death in 1972 in Greenwich, CT at age 96. By that time his nationwide empire of W. T. Grant Co. (Grants) and Grant City stores had grown to almost 1,200, although the company failed in 1975 and was soon liquidated.

References

External links
 William T. Grant Foundation 
 William T. Grant Foundation Archives

1876 births
1972 deaths
American businesspeople in retailing
People from Lynn, Massachusetts
People from Bradford County, Pennsylvania
20th-century American philanthropists
Businesspeople from Massachusetts
Businesspeople from Pennsylvania
20th-century American businesspeople
Philanthropists from Massachusetts
Philanthropists from Pennsylvania